Patrick Haegeli (born 13 April 1946) is a French sailor who competed in the 1976 Summer Olympics, in the 1984 Summer Olympics, and in the 1992 Summer Olympics.

References

1946 births
Living people
French male sailors (sport)
Olympic sailors of France
Sailors at the 1976 Summer Olympics – Soling
Sailors at the 1984 Summer Olympics – Soling
Sailors at the 1992 Summer Olympics – Star